Albert Guinovart (born 1962 in Barcelona) is a Spanish composer.

Guinovart studied at the Municipal Conservatory of Barcelona (Conservatori Municipal de Música de Barcelona). Since 2002 he teaches composition at ESMUC (Escola Superior de Música de Catalunya).

Works
Musicals: Mar i cel (1988, 2004) Flor de Nit (1992), Desconcerto Grosso (1994), Gaudí, el musical de Barcelona (2003) Paradís (2005).

 Guinovart. Piano Concerto No.1 Mar i Cel (Sea and Sky), from his musical of the same name. Piano Concerto No.2 Traces''. Petrenko. Symphonic poem El Lament de la Terra (2008). Roberto Minczuck Toccata Classics

References

People from Barcelona
1962 births
Living people
Composers from Catalonia